Erik van der Meer (born 7 July 1967 in Utrecht) is a Dutch professional football coach and a former player.

Manager career
Since January 2016 he is a head coach of FC Stal Dniprodzerzhynsk. But resigned on 10 August 2016.

Budapest Honvéd
On 28 May 2017, van der Meer was appointed as the Nemzeti Bajnokság I club Budapest Honvéd FC. On 9 December van de Meer was sacked.

References

1967 births
Living people
Footballers from Utrecht (city)
Dutch footballers
Dutch expatriate footballers
Expatriate footballers in Spain
Expatriate footballers in Belgium
Dutch expatriate sportspeople in Spain
Dutch expatriate sportspeople in Belgium
FC Utrecht players
K. Beerschot V.A.C. players
SC Cambuur players
Real Murcia players
SC Veendam players
Dutch football managers
Dutch expatriate football managers
Ukrainian Premier League managers
FC Stal Kamianske managers
Al Ahli SC (Doha) managers
Expatriate football managers in Ukraine
Expatriate football managers in Qatar
Expatriate football managers in Malaysia
Dutch expatriate sportspeople in Ukraine
Dutch expatriate sportspeople in Qatar
Dutch expatriate sportspeople in Malaysia
VV DOVO managers
Association football defenders
Expatriate football managers in Hungary
Dutch expatriate sportspeople in Hungary
Budapest Honvéd FC managers